Jan Adam Kaczkowski (born July 19, 1977, in Gdynia, died March 28, 2016, in Sopot) was a Polish Roman Catholic priest, doctor of theological sciences, bioethicist, organizer and director of the Puck Hospice.

Life 
Jan Kaczkowski was born on July 19, 1977, in Gdynia, Poland. After graduating from high school, Kaczkowski was admitted to the Gdańsk Theological Seminary, where in 2002 he defended his master's thesis in theology. The same year he was ordained a priest. Kaczkowski continued his studies, and in 2007 obtained a doctorate in theology at the Cardinal Stefan Wyszyński University in Warsaw, and a year later he completed postgraduate studies in bioethics at the Pontifical University of John Paul II in Krakow.

From 2004, he engaged himself in the creation of a hospice in Puck. He coordinated the construction of the hospice from 2007 to 2009. He remained the director of the institution until his death. In addition to working at the hospice, he worked as a catechist at a high school from 2004 to 2011, as well as serving as a vicar.

Kaczkowski suffered from health problems from birth, having a severe eyesight deficit and left-sided paresis. In 2012, he was further diagnosed with Glioblastoma, and he died from the condition on March 28, 2016.

Awards and legacy 

 On April 11, 2012, he was awarded the Order of Polonia Restituta by Polish president Bronisław Komorowski.
 He was awarded the title of honorary citizen of Puck.
 In 2022, a biographical film "Johnny" was released about his life. The movie had the second best Polish film result in the domestic box office in 2022.

References 

1977 births
2016 deaths
People from Gdynia
Polish Roman Catholic priests
Polish theologians